Mario Holek (born 28 October 1986) is a retired Czech footballer who represented the Czech Republic national football team.

He started his career in his hometown of Brno in the Czech Republic playing for the local club 1. FC Brno, where he spent five seasons. In January 2008, Holek was transferred to Ukraine, to a Premier Division club Dnipro Dnipropetrovsk. In December 2011 he joined Sparta as a free agent. Later in his career he played for Dukla Prague and Příbram.

References

External links

1986 births
Living people
Czech footballers
Czech Republic youth international footballers
Czech Republic under-21 international footballers
Czech Republic international footballers
Czech expatriate footballers
Expatriate footballers in Ukraine
Czech expatriate sportspeople in Ukraine
Czech First League players
FC Zbrojovka Brno players
FC Dnipro players
AC Sparta Prague players
FK Dukla Prague players
1. FK Příbram players
Ukrainian Premier League players
Footballers from Brno
Association football midfielders